
Queen Creek Unified School District (QCUSD)  is a school district based in Queen Creek, Arizona, United States. It was formed in 1947 from land once part of the Higley Unified School District (at the time, neither district was unified; Queen Creek High School would not open until 1967).

High schools
 Queen Creek High School
 Eastmark High School
 Crismon High School

Middle schools
 Queen Creek Junior High School
 Newell Barney Junior High School
 Eastmark Junior High School (At Eastmark High School)

Elementary schools
 Frances Brandon-Pickett
 Desert Mountain
 Jack Barnes
 Queen Creek
 Faith Mather Sossaman
 Gateway Polytechnic Academy
 Silver Valley
 Schnepf 
 Katherine Mecham Barney

See also
 Chandler Unified School District
 Higley Unified School District

References

External links
 

School districts in Maricopa County, Arizona
1947 establishments in Arizona